Thomas Coleman Andrews Jr. (February 15, 1925 – April 16, 1989) was an American businessman and politician who became known for his support of racial segregation.

Early and family life
Andrews was born in Richmond, Virginia, to T. Coleman Andrews (1899-1983), an accountant and government official who became leading isolationist after World War II, and his wife, Ros Reams (1900-1989). He had a younger brother, Wilson Pittman Andrews (1928-2012), who would serve in the U.S. Coast Guard and become an entrepreneur in Richmond. His grandfather, Cheatham W. Andrews (1865-1945), also lived with the family by 1940, and had a job as a night watchman at a tobacco manufacturing plant. T. Coleman Andrews Jr. graduated from Thomas Jefferson High School in Richmond (where he played on the football team), then received a B.A. from Dartmouth College. He attended the Wharton School of Business of the University of Pennsylvania for two years.

When Andrews reached age 18 in 1943, during World War II, he enlisted in the Reserves of the Army Air Corps, and served as a combat navigator. He married Barbara Ransome Andrews (1928-1975) in 1950 and they had three sons and a daughter. After her death on December 18, 1977, he married Courtney Franklin Sargeant, daughter of James Franklin Sargeant Jr. of Charlottesville and his wife, at St. Paul's Episcopal Church in Ivy in Albemarle County, Virginia.

Career
Upon returning from his wartime service, Andrews operated an insurance agency. His father received numerous honors and held various government positions during and after the war, then operated an accounting firm and related businesses and taught briefly at the University of Virginia's business school when he finished leading the Internal Revenue Service (1953-1955), and also ran for president (unsuccessfully). During the Korean War, the younger Andrews would serve as an auditor general. He was also active in the American Legion, Richmond Chamber of Commerce, Commonwealth Club and for a time was the secretary of the Richmond City Democratic Committee.

Richmond voters elected T. Coleman Andrews as one of their delegates to the Virginia House of Delegates in 1960, during the Massive Resistance crisis following the U.S. Supreme Court decisions in Brown v. Board of Education and related Virginia Supreme Court and federal court decisions. Richmond City and Henrico County voters elected Andrews alongside veterans George E. Allen Jr., E. Tucker Carlton, Harold H. Dervishian, Edward E. Lane, Fred G. Pollard, and David E. Satterfield III, and re-elected them all in 1962. In 1964, Richmond gained another seat following court-ordered reapportionment and Andrews won re-election with most of the previous delegates, although Junie L. Bradshaw, Louis S. Herrink Jr., and S. Strother Smith replaced Carlton and Satterfield (who had been elected to the U.S. Congress). In 1966, T. Dix Sutton and J. Sargeant Reynolds replaced Herrink and Smith. However, Andrews failed to win re-election in 1967, and was replaced by the first African American delegate since 1891, William Ferguson Reid.

Andrews helped organized the American Independent Party and in the 1968 U.S. Presidential elections, supported Alabama Governor George C. Wallace.

Death and legacy
Anderson died of a heart attack in his home, survived by his second wife, daughter, sons and grandchildren. He was buried at Hollywood Cemetery, as were his parents and brother. His son Allen Scott Andrews and Marvin Pierce Bush (brother of President George W. Bush) founded Winston Capital Management of Washington, D.C . The University of Virginia has posted online a video of a speech this Andrews delivered in Bedford, Virginia on September 6, 1968.

References

1925 births
1989 deaths
20th-century far-right politicians in the United States
Dartmouth College alumni
Wharton School of the University of Pennsylvania alumni
Democratic Party members of the Virginia House of Delegates
People from Richmond, Virginia
20th-century American politicians
American Independent Party politicians